The Football Writers' Association Women's Footballer of the Year (often called the FWA Women's Footballer of the Year, or in England simply the Women's Footballer of the Year) is an annual award given to the player who is voted as the best of the season in English football. The award has been presented since the 2017–18 season, with the inaugural winner being Chelsea forward Fran Kirby. The most recent winner of the award as of 2021–22, is Sam Kerr of Chelsea. 

The winner is selected by a vote amongst the members of the Football Writers' Association (FWA), which comprises around 400 football journalists based throughout England.

Winners

Breakdown of winners

By country

Winners by club

See also
PFA Women's Players' Player of the Year

References

External links
Football Writers' Association

English football trophies and awards
England 3
Awards established in 1948
2008 establishments in England
Annual events in England
Annual sporting events in the United Kingdom